Theophilus Oglethorpe, junior (11 March 1684 – c. 1737), of Westbrook Place, Godalming, was an English Tory politician, who sat in the House of Commons from 1708 to 1713.

He was educated at Eton College. Oglethorpe entered Parliament in 1708 as member for Haslemere, for which his father Sir Theophilus Oglethorpe and older brother Lewis had previously been MPs, and which was later represented by his younger brother James. He served in two parliaments, retiring in 1713.

Like his father, who had been equerry to James II and had gone into exile with him after the Glorious Revolution, Oglethorpe was a Jacobite sympathiser and shortly afterwards fled abroad to join the Old Pretender; his sister, Anne, was rumoured to be the Pretender's mistress. He was created Baron Oglethorpe of Oglethorpe in the Jacobite peerage on 20 December 1717 and remained at the court-in-exile at Saint Germain for the remainder of his life.

References

 Concise Dictionary of National Biography
www.godalming-museum.org.uk
 John Whitbourn's three book 'Downs-Lord' 'triptych' (1999–2002) contains a fantasy treatment of the life and death of Theophilus Oglethorpe junior.  Also, Theophilus Oglethorpe senior is the main protagonist in Whitbourn's  The Royal Changeling, (1998), which describes the 1685 Monmouth rebellion with some fantasy elements added.

1684 births
1730s deaths
People educated at Eton College
Members of the Parliament of Great Britain for English constituencies
Barons in the Jacobite peerage